Ursula Bloom (11 December 1892 – 29 October 1984) was a British novelist, biographer and journalist.

Biography 
Ursula Harvey Bloom was born on 11 December 1892 in Springfield, Chelmsford, Essex, the daughter of the Reverend James Harvey Bloom, about whom she wrote a biography, Parson Extraordinary. She also wrote about her gypsy ("Diddicoy") great-grandmother, Frances Graver (born 1809), who was known as the "Rose of Norfolk", a sobriquet used by Bloom as the title of her biography. Bloom lived for a number of years in Stratford-upon-Avon, which was the subject of another book, Rosemary for Stratford-upon-Avon.

She wrote her first book at the age of seven. Charles Dickens was always a dominant influence: she had read every book of his before she was ten years of age, and then re-read them in her teens. A prolific author, she wrote over 500 books, an achievement that earned her recognition in the 1975 edition of Guinness World Records. Many of her novels were written under various pen names, including Sheila Burns, Mary Essex, Rachel Harvey, Deborah Mann, Lozania Prole and Sara Sloane.  She appeared frequently on British television. Her journalistic experiences were written about in her book The Mightier Sword. Her hobbies included needlework, which she exhibited, and cooking. She was a Fellow of the Royal Historical Society.

Ursula Bloom married twice: firstly, in 1916, to Captain Arthur Brownlow Denham-Cookes of the 24th (Queen's) London Regiment, late of the Inner Temple (son of Colonel George Denham-Cookes of the 3rd King's Own Light Dragoons and Hon. Clara, daughter of Charles Brownlow, 2nd Baron Lurgan), in the face of his family's "sniffy disapproval"; his aristocratic mother was by this time a wealthy widow, of Prince's Gate, Knightsbridge. Their son, George Philip ("Pip") Jocelyn, was born in 1917 (he married in 1944, Lorna Jean Iris, daughter of Charles Lawson, of Romford, and had issue). Arthur died of influenza in 1918, in the final days of the war. In 1925 she married Charles Gower Robinson (d. 1979), a Royal Navy Paymaster Commander; they lived at 191, Cranmer Court, London SW3. She died on 29 October 1984, aged 91, in a nursing home in Nether Wallop, Hampshire.

Works 
 The Duke of Windsor
 Victorian Vinaigrette
 The Song of Philomel
 The Elegant Edwardian
 Youth at the Gate
 Down to the Sea in Ships
 War isn't Wonderful
 Twilight of a Tudor
 The Dragonfly
 The Flight of the Falcon
 The Ring Tree
 The Girl Who Loved Crippen (The Story of Dr Crippen and Ethel Le Neve)
 Parson Extraordinary (About Bloom's father, the Reverend Harvey Bloom)
 Rosemary for Stratford-upon-Avon (Written about the town by Bloom while she was living there)
 Rosemary for Frinton (Norfolk - UK)
 The Rose of Norfolk (About Bloom's great grandmother Frances Graver)
 Tea Is So Intoxicating (as Mary Essex)
 The Amorous Bicycle (as Mary Essex)
 Haircut For Samson (as Mary Essex)
 Nesting Cats (as Mary Essex)
 Eve Didn't Care (as Mary Essex)
 Marry To Taste (as Mary Essex)
 Freddy For Fun (as Mary Essex)
 ‘’Henry's Golden Queen’’ (as Lozania Prole)

References 

1892 births
1984 deaths
English women novelists
English biographers
English journalists
20th-century English novelists
20th-century English women writers
English women non-fiction writers
Women biographers
20th-century pseudonymous writers
Pseudonymous women writers